The 2022 Saint John's Johnnies football team represented Saint John's University as members of the Minnesota Intercollegiate Athletic Conference (MIAC) during the 2022 NCAA Division III football season. Led by ninth-year head coach Gary Fasching, the Johnnies compiled an overall record of 10–2 with a mark of 7–1 in conference play, winning the MIAC Northwoods Division title. The team played home games at Clemens Stadium in Collegeville, Minnesota.

Schedule
Saint John's 2022 regular season scheduled consisted of five home and four away games.

References

Saint John's
Saint John's Johnnies football seasons
Saint John's Johnnies football